Delly Singah is a Cameroonian born media personality, matchmaker and a Philanthropist. She is renowned for Delly's Matchups,a dating web Application and Delly TV, broadcasting original content representing the African culture in business, entertainment and politics weekly live interaction.

Background 
Delly, is a Cameroonian born UK based matchmaker, a native of Ngie, in Momo (department) Northwest Region (Cameroon).  The post news paper website in a publication dated March 28, 2019, confirmed she is the second child in a family of four, born & raised Delphine Anon Singah ‘‘‘in Bamenda the capital of the North west region of Cameroon.
No information about her parents has been published; someone can help expand this article with more background of Delly.

Career 
Delly became noticed, for the Online TV show on Delly TV Date with a star and the DEBATE, launched in July 2018. A host to Cameroonian footballer Eyong Enoh film actors Nkanya Nkwai Nchifor Valery, politicians etc. The sun News Paper called it ‘’a production house for modern and original content representing the African culture, tongue, style, and innovations’’.

As a philanthropist, she is the founder of Delly Singah Foundation helping start up businesses and projects in Cameroon. When asked what aspired her, she told the Sun news paper 
Delly, also have received credit for Delly's Matchups Cameroonian ace journalist NFOR Hanson Nchanji called it The First Pan African Dating Site.
In October 2018, at the fourth edition of the Cameroon Women Career Award (CWCA), she won the media personality award.

Personal life 
Delly Singah is married to Philip Samson, a Cameroonian/Nigerian Gospel Artist and keyboardist. They have a son.

Awards and recognition

See also 
 List of Cameroonian Actors
 Cinema of Cameroon

References

External links

Living people
Cameroonian film directors
Cameroonian actresses
1989 births
People from Bamenda